Adam Abeddou (born 17 August 1996) is a French professional footballer who plays as a forward for Championnat National 2 club Boulogne on loan from Dunkerque.

Club career
Abeddou is a youth product of the academies of his local side Saint-Laurent-Blangy, Lens, Valenciennes, and Wasquehal. He began his senior footballing career with Arras in the 4th division of France in 2015. He moved to Vimy, and in the first half of the 2021–22 season he was the top scorer in his group with 10 goals in 9 games. He transferred to Dunkerque in the Ligue 2 on 19 January 2022. He made his professional debut with Dunkerque in a 1–0 Ligue 2 win over Nîmes on 5 February 2022.

Personal life
Born in France, Abeddou is of Algerian descent.

References

External links
 

1996 births
French sportspeople of Algerian descent
Sportspeople from Arras
Footballers from Hauts-de-France
Living people
French footballers
Association football forwards
RC Lens players
Valenciennes FC players
Wasquehal Football players
USL Dunkerque players
US Boulogne players
Ligue 2 players
Championnat National players
Championnat National 2 players
Championnat National 3 players